The Church of St. Clement is a Roman Catholic church in the municipality of Watermael-Boitsfort in Brussels, Belgium. It is one of the earliest examples of Romanesque architecture in Belgium, dating from the 11th century.

History
The oldest parts of the church, the nave and bell tower, date from the 11th century. Various architectural features were added to the church when it was restored in 1871, during which work a number of historic tombstones were recovered.

The municipality's second church, the Church of St. Philomena, was built in 1826.

See also
 List of churches in Brussels
 Roman Catholicism in Belgium
 History of Brussels
 Belgium in "the long nineteenth century"

References

External links

 Eglise Saint-Clément at the official website of Watermael-Boitsfort

Roman Catholic churches in Brussels
Buildings and structures in Brussels
Medieval churches
Watermael-Boitsfort